Embellish the Lace (foaled March 8, 2012 in Kentucky) is an American Thoroughbred racemare who as a three-year-old in 2015 won the Grade 1 Alabama Stakes.

Career
Embellish the Lace competed in her first race at Aqueduct Racetrack on November 16, 2014, where he finished in 5th.

She won her next two races at Parx Casino and Racing and at Pimlico Race Course on December 13, 2014 and on June 4, 2015.

Embellish the Lace's first and only major win came at the 2015 Alabama Stakes. Her next race would prove to be her final as she suffered a leg injury when finishing fifth in the 2015 Cotillion Handicap. She was then sold to China Horse Club International in the fall of 2016.

Pedigree

References

American racehorses
2012 racehorse births
Racehorses bred in Kentucky
Racehorses trained in the United States
Thoroughbred family A5